The 2019 Rafael Nadal tennis season officially began on 14 January 2019, with the start of the Australian Open, and ended 24 November 2019 after Spain's victory at the conclusion of the Davis Cup Finals.

Year summary

Early hard court season

Brisbane International
Nadal was scheduled to play his first match of 2019 against Jo-Wilfried Tsonga at the 2019 Brisbane International, however he withdrew before the start of the tournament.

Australian Open

After retiring in the 2018 Australian Open QF to Marin Cilic, Nadal returned to the tournament as the 2nd seed. Although he was broken once during his first match against Australian James Duckworth, he had a strong showing, beating him in straight sets. He continued with his good form and had strong performances against his second and third round opponents, Aussies Matthew Ebden and Alex de Minaur. In the fourth round, Nadal faced former World No.4 Tomáš Berdych, who although was injured for the latter half of the 2018 season had a strong start to 2019. Nadal, however, comfortably defeated Berdych in straight sets as well. In the QF, Nadal faced American Frances Tiafoe, who was making his first QF appearance in a Grand Slam event. Nadal was able to comfortably hold his service games, as well as break Tiafoe multiple times in a straight set victory. In the SF, Nadal faced Greek Stefanos Tsitsipas, who made his first Grand Slam SF appearance. Nadal was victorious in straight sets, and made his way to his first Australian Open final since 2017. He entered the final having not lost his serve since his opener against Duckworth. However, Nadal lost in straight sets to Novak Djokovic, and was broken five times. It was his first ever straight set loss in a grand slam final.

Mexican Open
Nadal participated in the Mexican Open for the first time since 2017, after withdrawing in 2018. He defeated Mischa Zverev of Germany in the first round in straight sets, but lost in three sets in the 2nd round to Nick Kyrgios despite having three match points.

Indian Wells Masters
In 2019 Nadal participated in the Indian Wells Masters for the first time since 2017. He had a bye in the first round, and then defeated Jared Donaldson and 25th seed Diego Schwartzman in straight sets to set up his 4th round match with Filip Krajinović. He also defeated Krajinović in straight sets, and made it to the quarter-finals for the first time since 2016. There he defeated 12th seed Karen Khachanov to book his first meeting since 2017 with Roger Federer, whom he lost to in this tournament in the 4th round in 2017. Unfortunately, due to a knee injury sustained during his QF match, Nadal was forced to withdraw from his match against Federer, ending his run at Indian Wells.

Spring clay court season

Monte-Carlo Masters
Nadal returned to competition at the Monte Carlo Masters, where he was the three-time defending champion. He scored dominant wins over Roberto Bautista Agut and Grigor Dimitrov to reach the quarterfinals, where he faced Guido Pella. Nadal defeated Pella in two sets to set up a semifinal encounter against Fabio Fognini. Fognini defeated Nadal in straight sets, ending his 18-match winning streak at the tournament.

Barcelona Open
Nadal's next event was at the Barcelona Open, where he was the three-time defending champion. After a bye in the first round, Nadal had a tough second round match against Leonardo Mayer, but ultimately prevailed in three sets. Nadal defeated Ferrer and Jan-Lennard Struff in straight sets to make it to the semifinals, where he was ousted by Dominic Thiem in two sets. The loss meant that the 2019 season was the first since 2004 in which Nadal failed to win a title in first four months of the year.

Madrid Open
Still seeking his first title of 2019, Nadal's next event was at Madrid. In the first round, he defeated Félix Auger-Aliassime of Canada in straight sets. Nadal then advanced to the quarterfinals, by defeating Frances Tiafoe. He beat Stan Wawrinka in the quarterfinal comfortably. But he lost to Stefanos Tsitsipas in the semifinal in three sets. After the loss Nadal claimed that he was not worried about his form.

Italian Open
As the defending champion, Nadal came into Rome still seeking his first clay court title of the year. After a bye in the first round, in the second and third rounds, he defeated Jérémy Chardy and Nikoloz Basilashvili in straight sets. He faced Fernando Verdasco in the quarterfinals, a match which he comfortably won. Nadal earned his first top ten victory of 2019 by defeating Stefanos Tsitsipas in the semifinals, in a rematch of the Madrid Open semifinal between them just one week before. In the final, he faced Novak Djokovic in their first meeting since the Australian Open. Nadal won the match in three sets, clinching his first title of 2019 and his 9th title in Rome.

French Open

In an attempt to win a record 12th title at Roland Garros, and defend his championship from last year, Nadal's next tournament is the French Open. His first two matches were against qualifiers Yannick Hanfmann and Yannick Maden, both of whom he defeated in straight sets. In the 3rd round, he defeated David Goffin in 4 sets, and in the 4th round Juan Ignacio Londero in straight sets. In the QF, he defeated Kei Nishikori in straight sets to set up a meeting with 3rd seed and long time rival Roger Federer. The pair have met at the French Open 5 times, with Nadal winning all 5 matches. This was their 6th meeting at RG, and the first since 2011. Nadal took the victory in straight sets, and reached his 3rd consecutive final at Roland Garros. In the final, a rematch of last year's final with Dominic Thiem, Nadal was able to win his 18th GS title, and his 12th at Roland Garros with a victory in 4 sets.

Grass court season

Wimbledon

Nadal returned to Wimbledon in an attempt to win his 3rd Wimbledon title, after a SF appearance in 2018. In the first round, he defeated Yūichi Sugita in straight sets, to set up a well anticipated 2nd round encounter with Nick Kyrgios. Kyrgios, as a teenager in 2014 had defeated Nadal at Wimbledon in the 4R, and this will be their first encounter since on the grass court. Nadal defeated Kyrgios in 4 sets, setting up a meeting with former World No. 5 Jo-Wilfried Tsonga. Nadal defeated Tsonga, João Sousa, and Sam Querrey in straight sets to set up a SF encounter with Roger Federer. This was their first meeting at the All England Club since the 2008 final. This time, Federer prevailed in 4 close sets and proceeded to his 12th Wimbledon final.

North American hard court season

Canadian Open
Nadal's first tournament in the North American hard court season was the Canadian Open in Montréal, where he opted to defend his title from 2018, and win a 5th overall title at the tournament. After receiving a bye in the first round, he defeated Dan Evans and Guido Pella in the second and third rounds to reach the QF. His QF matchup was against Fabio Fognini. Fognini took the first set, but Nadal took the next two easily to win the match in three sets to make his 7th SF in Canada. In the SF, he was due face Gaël Monfils, but unfortunately Monfils had to withdraw out of the match due an injury, allowing Nadal to advance to a second consecutive Rogers Cup final, where he faced Daniil Medvedev. He was able to defeat Medvedev in two quick sets to claim his 5th title in Canada. Nadal also defended a title off clay for the first time in his career, and also won a record 35th Masters 1000 title.

US Open
Having not played Cincinnati after his victory in Canada, Nadal's next tournament was the 2019 US Open, where he was seeded 2nd. Nadal's first match was against John Millman, which he won in straight sets. He was due to play Thanasi Kokkinakis in the 2nd round, but due to injury, Kokkinakis retired before the start of the match. Nadal went on to play Chung Hyeon in the 3rd round, who he defeated in straight sets, and Marin Čilić in the 4th round, whom he defeated in 4 sets. In the QF, he defeated Diego Schwartzman in straight sets, to set up a SF meeting with first time major semifinalist Matteo Berrettini. Nadal beat Berrettini 7–6(8–6), 6–4, 6–1 to reach his 5th US Open final, where he had a rematch of thee Montréal final with Daniil Medvedev. Nadal won in 5 sets after having a 2 set lead; and with this victory, won his 4th US Open and 19th Grand Slam title.

European indoor hard court season

Paris Masters
Having not played since the US Open as he missed the Asian swing due to his wedding, Nadal will next play the Paris Masters. He defeated Adrian Mannarino, Stan Wawrinka, and Jo-Wilfried Tsonga in straight sets to reach the Semi-Finals. However, due to an abdominal injury, Nadal was forced to withdraw from his match against Denis Shapovalov.

After the conclusion of the Paris Masters, Nadal regained the World No. 1 position for the first time in 2019.

ATP Finals

Nadal played the ATP Finals, although he suffered an abdominal injury during the Paris Masters. He was placed in Group Andre Agassi for the Round Robin stage, along with Alexander Zverev, Daniil Medvedev and Stefanos Tsitsipas. 

Nadal lost his first Round Robin match against Zverev in straight sets, the Spaniard not being able to respond to the serving performance of the German. In the next match against Medvedev, Nadal lost the first set in a tiebreak but was able to win the second set to bring the match to a deciding set. After going down 5–1 in the third set with defeat imminent, Nadal went on to break Medvedev twice to bring the match to a tiebreak, where he was able to win his first match at the ATP Finals since 2015.

After the defeat of Novak Djokovic by Roger Federer in the round-robin, Nadal claimed his 5th year-end no.1 and became the first man to be No.1 in 3 different decades. Concurrently, he became the oldest year-end no.1 and set the record for the longest gap between first and last year-end no.1's.

Nadal defeated Tsitsipas in 3 sets in his final round-robin match, but unfortunately, due to Medvedev's loss against Zverev, he will not proceed to the Semi-Finals.

Davis Cup Finals
Nadal's final tournament of the year was the Davis Cup, which was held in its new format in Madrid. In his first match for Spain, he played in the round robin against Russia, where he defeated Karen Khachanov in straight sets. 

In his next match, he played Croatian Borna Gojo, whom he also defeated in straight sets. Nadal also played in the doubles match against Croatia, partnered with compatriot Marcel Granollers. The pair won the doubles match in straight sets against Ivan Dodig and Mate Pavić. 

In the quarterfinal, Spain played Argentina, and Nadal's next match was against Argentine Diego Schwartzman, whom he defeated in straight sets. In the doubles, he won in 3 sets against Leonardo Mayer and Máximo González alongside Granollers. This resulted in Spain moving forward onto the semifinals against Great Britain. In singles, Nadal defeated Dan Evans in straight sets. In doubles, Nadal partnered with Feliciano Lopez and won against Jamie Murray and Neal Skupski in straight sets, leading Spain to the Davis Cup final for the first time since 2012.

In the final, Spain's first match was played by Roberto Bautista Agut, against Félix Auger-Aliassime. Bautista Agut was able to defeat Alissame in straight sets, to set up an encounter between Denis Shapovalov and Nadal. Nadal won the match 6–3, 7–6(8–6) to lead Spain to a 6th Davis Cup victory. Nadal withstood both single and double matches, spending over 14 hours on court in 6 days. He was awarded the Davis Cup Most Valuable Player (MVP) trophy, after he won 8 of the 8 matches he participated in.

All matches
This table chronicles all the matches of Rafael Nadal in 2019.

Singles matches

Doubles matches

Exhibition matches

Singles

Doubles

Schedule
Per Rafael Nadal, the below was his 2019 schedule.

Singles schedule

Doubles schedule

Yearly records

Head-to-head matchups
Rafael Nadal has a  ATP match win–loss record in the 2019 season. Bold indicates player was ranked top 10 at time of at least one meeting. The following list is ordered by number of wins: 

  Daniil Medvedev 3–0
  Diego Schwartzman 3–0
  Stefanos Tsitsipas 3–1
  Dan Evans 2–0
  Karen Khachanov 2–0
  Guido Pella 2–0
  Frances Tiafoe 2–0
  Jo-Wilfried Tsonga 2–0
  Stan Wawrinka 2–0
  Félix Auger-Aliassime 1–0
  Nikoloz Basilashvili 1–0
  Roberto Bautista Agut 1–0
  Tomáš Berdych 1–0
  Matteo Berrettini 1–0
  Jérémy Chardy 1–0
  Marin Čilić 1–0
  Alex de Minaur 1–0
  Grigor Dimitrov 1–0
  Jared Donaldson 1–0
  James Duckworth 1–0
  Matthew Ebden 1–0
  David Ferrer 1–0
  David Goffin 1–0
  Borna Gojo 1–0
  Yannick Hanfmann 1–0
  Chung Hyeon 1–0
  Filip Krajinović 1–0
  Juan Ignacio Londero 1–0
  Yannick Maden 1–0
  Adrian Mannarino 1–0
  Leonardo Mayer 1–0
  John Millman 1–0
  Kei Nishikori 1–0
  Sam Querrey 1–0
  Milos Raonic 1–0
  Denis Shapovalov 1–0
  João Sousa 1–0
  Jan-Lennard Struff 1–0
  Yūichi Sugita 1–0
  Fernando Verdasco 1–0
  Mischa Zverev 1–0
  Novak Djokovic 1–1
  Roger Federer 1–1
  Fabio Fognini 1–1
  Nick Kyrgios 1–1
  Dominic Thiem 1–1
  Alexander Zverev 0–1

* Statistics correct .

Finals

Singles: 5 (4 titles, 1 runner-up)

Team competitions: 2 (2 titles)

Earnings

 Figures in United States dollars (USD) unless noted.

Television

At the Barcelona Open, the semifinals match versus Dominic Thiem had an average 914,000 viewers and 8.2% share on La 1.

At the Madrid Masters, the quarter-finals match versus Stanislas Wawrinka had an average 631,000 viewers, and the semifinals match versus Stefanos Tsitsipas had an average 912,000 viewers and 6.7% share, both on Teledeporte.

At the French Open, the semifinals match versus Roger Federer had an average 676,000 viewers and 3.7% share on DMAX and Eurosport. The final match versus Dominic Thiem had an average 2,480,000 viewers and a 19.5% share, also on DMAX and Eurosport.

At the US Open, the final match versus Daniil Medvedev averaged 575,000 viewers and a 6.1% share on Eurosport.

At the Laver Cup, the singles match versus Milos Raonic averaged 462,000 viewers and a 4.6% share, and the doubles match with Stefanos Tsitsipas versus John Isner / Jack Sock averaged 297,000 viewers and a 2,2% share, both on Teledeporte.

The Davis Cup final singles match versus Canada's Denis Shapovalov had an average 745,000 viewers and a 5.0% share on #Vamos.

See also
 2019 ATP Tour
 2019 Roger Federer tennis season
 2019 Novak Djokovic tennis season

References

External links 
 
ATP tour profile

Rafael Nadal tennis seasons
Nadal
2019 in Spanish tennis
2019 in Spanish sport